Mangal is a Middle Eastern barbecue—both the event and the grilling apparatus itself.

Etymology
The word mangal is derived from the Arabic word manqal (منقل) meaning "portable" and originally referred to portable heaters used by Bedouin to warm tents during the cold desert evenings. The portability of heating equipment - as well as all other belongings - is vital for the Bedouin's nomadic lifestyle. Today, these Mangals have largely been replaced by modern heaters and stoves.

Mangal also refers to the social gathering of family or friends in gardens or picnic areas.

Description
A mangal is typically used to grill various cuts of meat, such as steak, hamburgers, kebab, shashlik, chicken wings and chicken breasts. Roasted vegetables, salads and other cold foods accompany the meal.

References

External links
The Independence Day Barbecue, More than American Tradition

Barbecue
Eating parties
Arab cuisine
Israeli cuisine
Turkish cuisine
Middle Eastern cuisine
Passover